Alexander Robinson (19 August 1886 – 4 October 1967) was an Australian rules footballer who played with Essendon in the Victorian Football League (VFL). He also had a noted football career in Western Australia, during which time he became a first-class cricketer for the state team.

Early years in Victoria
One of four Robinson brothers to play in the VFL, he was just 17 when he played for Essendon in the 1904 VFL season. Robinson, who was a former Brighton junior, played nine games over the course of the year. Eight of those games were with brothers Bill and Fred Robinson. His other sibling was Gordon Robinson, who made a single appearance for St Kilda in 1911.

Robinson had two sons, Alexander William and George, who both played first-class cricket in Western Australia.

Goldfields football
A follower, Robinson later moved to Western Australia and played football for Boulder City in the Goldfields Football League. He was the league's best player award winner in 1907 and a member of five premiership teams.

He represented Western Australia in the 1908 Melbourne Carnival, withdrew from the 1911 Adelaide Carnival through injury and represented the state once more at the 1914 Sydney Carnivals.

Cricket
Robinson was a right handed middle order batsman who batted at four in his only first-class match, which was played against the touring Marylebone Cricket Club of England in 1907/08. Playing on the Western Australia Cricket Association Ground, Robinson scored 23 in the first innings and just one in the second. He was dismissed by English Test cricketer Jack Crawford both times.

Coaching career
After the war ended, Robinson had served as non-playing coach at Boulder City. He was appointed senior coach of Subiaco, in the West Australian Football League, for the 1928 season and remained there for two years. In his first season in charge he guided the club to third position and in 1929 steered them to fourth.

See also
 1908 Melbourne Carnival
 List of Western Australia first-class cricketers

Footnotes

1886 births
1967 deaths
Australian Rules footballers: place kick exponents
Essendon Football Club players
Boulder City Football Club players
Subiaco Football Club coaches
Australian cricketers
Western Australia cricketers
Australian rules footballers from Melbourne
Cricketers from Melbourne
People from Brighton, Victoria